The 1985 European Grand Prix (formally the Shell Oils Grand Prix of Europe) was a Formula One motor race held at Brands Hatch on 6 October 1985. It was the fourteenth race of the 1985 Formula One World Championship.

The 75-lap race was won by Nigel Mansell, driving a Williams-Honda. It was Mansell's first Formula One victory in his 72nd race start. Ayrton Senna finished second in a Lotus-Renault, having started from pole position, while Mansell's teammate Keke Rosberg finished third. Alain Prost finished fourth in his McLaren-TAG which, combined with Michele Alboreto's retirement with a turbo failure, secured the Frenchman his first Drivers' Championship.

Qualifying

Qualifying report
Ayrton Senna took his sixth pole position of the season in his Lotus-Renault, averaging , the first time anyone had lapped the Brands Hatch circuit faster than 140 mph. Compatriot Nelson Piquet was second in his Brabham-BMW, 0.3 seconds behind, followed by the Williams-Hondas of Nigel Mansell and Keke Rosberg. Philippe Streiff was a surprise fifth in his Ligier, ahead of Alain Prost's McLaren; the top ten was completed by Marc Surer in the second Brabham, Derek Warwick in the Renault, Elio de Angelis in the second Lotus and Jacques Laffite in the second Ligier. Prost's Drivers' Championship rival, Michele Alboreto, could only manage 15th in his Ferrari.

Prost's teammate Niki Lauda was unfit to race due to the wrist injury he had suffered at the previous race in Belgium. Watson's participation marked the last time to date a Formula One driver raced with number 1 without having been World Champion the previous season. Tyrrell had re-expanded to two cars, with Martin Brundle joined by Italian newcomer Ivan Capelli, who qualified 24th.

Qualifying classification

Race

Race report
Senna led off the line from a fast-starting Mansell, while Prost slid onto the grass and fell to 14th. Mansell then ran wide at Druids, allowing Rosberg and Piquet past.

On lap 7, Rosberg attempted to overtake Senna, but the Brazilian blocked the move causing Rosberg to spin at Surtees Corner, and was unavoidably hit by Piquet in third. The Brabham was out on the spot with a broken front suspension, while Rosberg limped back to the pits with a puncture, losing a full lap in the process. Mansell was now second again, followed by de Angelis, Stefan Johansson in the second Ferrari and Surer, with Prost up to seventh following a charge through the field. When Rosberg exited the pits he rejoined in front of the leaders. An aggrieved Rosberg blocked Senna (who he felt was responsible for the earlier incident). Rosberg cleverly positioned his car which allowed teammate Mansell to catch up to the Lotus before getting past at Surtees. Rosberg then allowed Mansell through, and the Englishman then set about building a lead, while Rosberg continued to hold up Senna.

On lap 14 Alboreto, who had made a good start and had run as high as sixth, suffered a fiery turbo failure, effectively ending his Championship challenge. Prost, running sixth at this point, now only needed to finish fifth to secure the title. Surer had moved ahead of Johansson by this stage and was closing on de Angelis, while Laffite was also on a charge, passing Prost and Johansson in quick succession.

Surer overtook de Angelis on lap 21, followed soon after by Laffite. The two then closed up to Senna, Surer getting past on lap 35 and Laffite one lap later. At this point, Mansell's lead was 14 seconds, while Prost was still seventh.

On lap 51, having just been re-passed by Senna, Laffite pitted for new tyres, dropping to eighth and promoting Johansson to fourth. Shortly afterwards, Prost passed de Angelis for fifth as the two were lapping Watson; this became fourth when Johansson started to suffer an electrical problem. Laffite retired on lap 59 with an engine failure, followed one lap later by Johansson.

Surer was still running second when, on lap 63, he suffered a turbo failure similar to Alboreto's. This left Mansell around 20 seconds clear of Senna, with Prost now third, de Angelis fourth and Rosberg back up to fifth. Rosberg soon passed de Angelis before Prost, taking no chances, allowed the Finn through into the final podium position.

Up front, Mansell cruised to his first Formula One victory, his final margin over Senna being 21.4 seconds. Rosberg finished 37 seconds behind Senna and eight ahead of Prost, who celebrated becoming France's first Formula One Drivers' Champion. De Angelis and the Arrows of Thierry Boutsen rounded out the top six, Boutsen holding off Watson for the final point in what would turn out to be the Ulsterman's last F1 race.

Race classification

Championship standings after the race 

Drivers' Championship standings

Constructors' Championship standings

Note: Only the top five positions are included for both sets of standings.

References

External links

European Grand Prix
European Grand Prix
European Grand Prix